Ehretia microphylla, synonym Carmona retusa, also known as the Fukien tea tree or Philippine tea tree, is a species of flowering plant in the borage family, Boraginaceae.

Description
Ehretia microphylla is a shrub growing to 4 m height, with long, straggling, slender branches.  It is deciduous during the dry season.  Its leaves are usually 10–50 mm long and 5–30 mm wide, and may vary in size, texture, colour and margin.  It has small white flowers 8–10 mm in diameter with a 4–5 lobed corolla, and drupes 4–6 mm in diameter, ripening brownish orange.

Distribution and habitat
The plant occurs widely in eastern and south-eastern Asia from India, Indochina, southern China, and Japan, through Malesia, including the Australian territory of Christmas Island, reaching New Guinea, mainland Australia at the Cape York Peninsula, and the Solomon Islands.  It has become an invasive weed in Hawaii where it is a popular ornamental plant and where the seeds are thought to be spread by frugivorous birds.

On Cape York Peninsula, the plant is recorded from semi-evergreen vine thickets.  On Christmas Island, it favours dry sites on the terraces, and sometimes occurs in rainforest.

Uses
The plant is popular in Penjing in China.  The leaves are used medicinally in the Philippines to treat cough, colic, diarrhea and dysentery.

References

Ehretioideae
Garden plants
Plants used in bonsai
Flora of China
Flora of Christmas Island
Flora of Malesia
Flora of New Guinea
Flora of the Solomon Islands (archipelago)
Plants described in 1792